The Embassy of Bangladesh in Washington, D.C. is the diplomatic mission of The People's Republic of Bangladesh to the United States. It is located at 3510 International Drive, Northwest, Washington, D.C., in the Cleveland Park neighborhood.
The embassy also operates Consulates-General in New York City, Los Angeles. and Miami.

H.E. Muhammad Imran is the Ambassador.

History
The first temporary embassy of Bangladesh in Washington, D.C., was located on Connecticut Avenue.

In March 1973, Bangladesh bought a building at 1732 Massachusetts Avenue NW, with the intention of establishing it as its first official embassy in Washington, D.C. Some local residents opposed having an embassy at the location. Bangladesh sent an application to convert the home into a chancery, and the District of Columbia Board of Zoning Appeals decided to deny the request. The Embassy of Bangladesh disagreed with the denial of its application, stating that the building was located in a designated chancery zone. Bangladesh sold the building to the Republic of Chile, which successfully established its embassy in the building.

The Embassy of Bangladesh in Washington, D.C., ended up being successfully established at 2201 Wisconsin Avenue NW.

In 2000, Embassy of Bangladesh moved to 3510 International Drive NW. The building was designed by architect Edward Garcia from the firm of SmithGroup Architects.

The architect designed the building's exterior as an abstract metaphor for the delta of the Ganges River. The wings on the roof symbolize unfolding lotus blossoms, and the green stone at the entrance resembles a flowing river.

References

External links

wikimapia

Bangladesh
Washington, D.C.
Bangladesh–United States relations
North Cleveland Park